25th meridian may refer to:

25th meridian east, a line of longitude east of the Greenwich Meridian
25th meridian west, a line of longitude west of the Greenwich Meridian
25th meridian west from Washington, a line of longitude west of the Washington Meridian